Jerry Cassell (born 12 January 1975) is an Australian cricketer. He played in fourteen first-class matches for Queensland between 1996 and 2002.

See also
 List of Queensland first-class cricketers

References

External links
 

1975 births
Living people
Australian cricketers
Queensland cricketers
Cricketers from Sydney